Innesa is a monotypic genus of ammotrechid camel spiders, first described by Carl Friedrich Roewer in 1934. Its single species, Innesa vittata is distributed in Costa Rica and Guatemala.

References 

Solifugae
Arachnid genera
Monotypic arachnid genera